Unreal II: The Awakening is a first-person shooter video game developed by Legend Entertainment and published by Infogrames under the Atari brand for Microsoft Windows, the game was later ported to Microsoft's Xbox console by Tantalus. It is the sequel to the 1998 video game Unreal and part of the franchise of the same name. Cliff Bleszinski was an executive producer for the title.

Plot

The player controls a former Marine John Dalton, a Terran Colonial Authority Marshal whose job is to patrol remote areas of space far away from any real action. He is called back into service to retrieve seven pieces of an ancient artifact thought to make a powerful weapon when assembled.

Gameplay

The player moves through the game in first person and can shoot, interact with and speak to characters and objects they encounter throughout. Progress is made through each level by destroying enemies and taking actions to open up the path ahead, by interacting with the environment. When exploring enemy planets or bases, instructions and assistance are provided from a spaceship in orbit. Missions are defined by different planets or areas, with 'interlude' levels in between them where the player can explore said spaceship. During this time, the player can interact with and other characters to enhance their equipment for the next mission.

eXpanded MultiPlayer

Unreal II: eXpanded MultiPlayer was developed by Legend Entertainment for Atari to deliver on the original promise to extend the original single player game Unreal II with a multiplayer functionality. The first playable version was released and made available for download on December 9, 2003. Almost nearing completion, the development of the game was suddenly halted by the unexpected close-down of Legend Entertainment on January 16, 2004. Unreal Tournament: Expanded Multiplayer (UT XMP) is a port of the same to Unreal Tournament 2004.

Gameplay 
XMP is a team-based game, where the players are split into two teams, red and blue. Both teams have a base with an Artifact Node. Each Artifact Node initially contains two Artifacts. The main objective is to steal the enemy's Artifacts and then register them at the Artifact Node belonging to the player's own team, but a team can also win by capturing and holding all generators, effectively draining the enemy team's energy.

Energy is required for almost everything in the game: weapons, vehicles and even the player's advanced movements. Autonomous mechanical defenses (so-called "Deployables") consume the most energy. Without energy, registering the enemy's Artifacts as their own cannot be done. Each map has a number of Generators which can be hacked by each team to provide energy. There are two separate supplies of Energy a player is concerned with: their team's Energy supply (the tall blue bar to the extreme lower right of the HUD) and their personal Energy reserve (the short yellow bar to the immediate left of the team energy bar). The personal Energy reserve is depleted when performing any of the 'advanced' functions of the game; i.e. hacking an object, deploying a turret or a mine, healing a teammate or activating jump jets. Some things, however, draw directly from the team's energy reserve, such as deployed turrets, or driving or firing from a vehicle. The player's personal reserve is refilled from the team's energy bank; therefore, if every team member 'spends' their energy frivolously, the team will soon find itself without defenses, vehicles, or even a place to register stolen artifacts. For this reason, a player should handle their energy responsibly, at least until their team has enough Generators under its control to support multiple energy-intensive activities.

In XMP, players can choose to spawn as one of three character classes. The classes have several different attributes, such as speed, armor and weapons. All classes have a stamina bar and the ability to sprint; sprinting roughly doubles the player's base speed (determined by their class) and depletes their stamina bar at a constant rate. In vehicles this is represented instead by a turbo bar, activated by the driver with the same key. The player's speed is represented by a tall blue bar to the lower left of the HUD and an abstract value next to it; stamina is represented by the short yellow bar to the immediate right of the speed indicator.

XMP has three vehicles: Raptor, Harbinger and Juggernaut. Like the player classes, each vehicle type has specific advantages and disadvantages over the other ones, like speed, armor and weaponry. Driving a vehicle or firing a vehicle weapon uses energy from the team's reserve. Throughout the battlefields are deployment points at which players can spawn after being killed. Most deploy points can be hacked like generators and hence taken over by the opposing team. Deployables can be deployed by a Tech or a Gunner. The Tech can place automatic weapons and force fields. The Gunner can place mines.

Reception

The game sold over 100,000 units in the German market by August 2003. In the United Kingdom, it sold 40,000 units during the first half of 2003, which made it the fourth-best-selling computer game during the period. Kristan Reed of GamesIndustry.biz wrote that Unreal IIs performance was "less than inspiring after the hype and expectation", and that "a slow descent into budget territory awaits the game". In a 2019 retrospective, Hardcore Gaming stated that "Unreal II isn’t a bad game on its own, it’s just a different one".

References

External links

2003 video games
Atari games
First-person shooters
Infogrames games
Multiplayer and single-player video games
Multiplayer online games
Unreal Engine games
Unreal (video game series)
Video games about extraterrestrial life
Video games developed in the United States
Video games featuring black protagonists
Video games scored by Alexander Brandon
Video games scored by Chance Thomas
Video games scored by Clint Bajakian
Video games scored by Jack Wall
Video games scored by Jeremy Soule
Video game sequels
Video games set on fictional planets
Video games with expansion packs
Windows games
Xbox games
Tantalus Media games
Legend Entertainment games